Eric Allan Cunningham (March 16, 1957 – January 22, 1995) was an American football offensive lineman in the National Football League (NFL) who played for the New York Jets. He played college football at Penn State University.

Early years
Cunningham attended at South High School in Akron, Ohio.

College career
Cunningham attended and played college football at the Penn State from 1975 to 1978.

Professional career
Cunningham was selected in the fourth round (#96 overall) of the 1979 NFL Draft by the New York Jets.

Personal life
Cunningham died at the age of 37 on January 22, 1995, in New Haven, Connecticut.

References 

1957 births
1995 deaths
Players of American football from Akron, Ohio
Penn State Nittany Lions football players
New York Jets players
St. Louis Cardinals (football) players